Maurice Rabier (12 November 1907 – 28 July 1999) was a French politician.

Rabier was born in Oran, French Algeria.  He represented the French Section of the Workers' International (SFIO) in the Constituent Assembly elected in 1945, in the Constituent Assembly elected in 1946 and in the National Assembly from 1946 to 1955.

References

1907 births
1999 deaths
People from Oran
People of French Algeria
Pieds-Noirs
French Section of the Workers' International politicians
Members of the Constituent Assembly of France (1945)
Members of the Constituent Assembly of France (1946)
Deputies of the 1st National Assembly of the French Fourth Republic
Deputies of the 2nd National Assembly of the French Fourth Republic